The team dressage at the 2014 World Equestrian Games in Normandy was held at Stade Michel d'Ornano on 25 and 26 August 2014.

German team won gold medal, their first World Equestrian Games gold in team dressage since 2006. The silver medal was won by the British team while the Dutch team, the defending champions, won the bronze medal.

Competition format

The team scores were based on the Grand Prix results. In order to compete, team had to have three or four riders entered. Grand Prix results were also used for the individual dressage competition.

Schedule

All times are Central European Summer Time (UTC+2)

Results

References

2014 in equestrian